Euderces spinicornis is a species of beetle in the family Cerambycidae. It was described by Louis Alexandre Auguste Chevrolat in 1835 and is known from South, Central, and North America, specifically from Colombia, Honduras, Guatemala, and southern Mexico (Veracruz).

References

Euderces
Beetles of South America
Beetles of Central America
Beetles of North America
Beetles described in 1835
Taxa named by Louis Alexandre Auguste Chevrolat